Ambuthirtha is a mountain located  from the village of Thirthahalli, Shimoga District of the state of Karnataka, India. It is the headwaters of the Sharavathi river.

History

Etymology
The name "Ambuthirtha" refers to a part of Hindu mythology that legend says happened here, which is the reason a temple to Rama is located in the area.

The Legend
According to ancient legend, the god Rama shot at the ground with his Ambu (translates to bow & arrow) because his wife, Sita, was thirsty (translates to Thirtha). When his arrow hit the ground, water poured out and quenched her thirst. Because the river, according to the legend, originated with this event, the river is called "Sharavathi" as "Shara" translates to arrow. A Shivalinga is installed at Ambuthirtha, under which river Sharavathi originates to start her journey.

Hydroelectric Power Plants
The river has two Hydroelectric plants built on it that supply electricity for much of the state of Karnataka. The first plant, which is upstream, is known as the Mahatma Gandhi Hydroelectric Power Station. The second plant, closer to the bottom of the mountain, is the Shavarathi Valley Project. The nearest city is called Hosanagara (ಹೊಸನಗರ ಶಿವಮೊಗ್ಗ ಕರ್ನಾಟಕ), and is a major employer in the area. The company that runs the plants is  "Ambuthirtha Power Private Limited", headquartered in Bengaluru.

Habitation
There is a temple to the god Rama on this mountain, accompanied by a small pond. The water level in this pond remains the same all year round due to the Sharavathi river which originates underneath it. Small creeks feed into the pond as well and help maintain the ponds equilibrium. The water level remains the same regardless of the type of season, rainy or dry. The temple's upkeep is financed by donations of the local population as it is believed to be a sacred site.

References

Geography of Shimoga district
Mountains of Karnataka